Hugues Broussard (4 March 1934 – 18 February 2019) was a French breaststroke swimmer who competed in the 1956 Summer Olympics.

References

1934 births
2019 deaths
French male breaststroke swimmers
Olympic swimmers of France
Swimmers at the 1956 Summer Olympics
Mediterranean Games medalists in swimming
Mediterranean Games gold medalists for France
Swimmers at the 1955 Mediterranean Games
20th-century French people
21st-century French people